Aadhavan is the pseudonym of K.S. Sundaram, 21 March 1942 – 19 July 1987),  a Tamil writer from Tamil Nadu, India.

Biography
Sundaram was born in Kallidaikurichi in Tirunelveli District and obtained his education in Delhi. He worked briefly for Indian Railways. Later he joined the National Book Trust of India as an assistant editor. He married Hema in 1976. He started his literary career as a writer of stories for children in the magazine Kannan. He wrote under the pseudonym Aadhavan (lit. The Sun). His most noted work was the novel En peyar Ramaseshan (lit. My name is Ramaseshan), which was translated into Russian by Vitaliy Furnika and sold over a hundred thousand copies. In 1987, he drowned while swimming in a river at Shringeri. He was awarded the Sahitya Akademi Award for Tamil posthumously for his collection of short stories Mudalil iravu varum (lit. First comes the night).

Bibliography

Novels
En Peyar Ramaseshan
Kagitha Malargal
Kanagathin Naduvae

Novellas
Iravukku mun varuvadhu maalai
Siragugal
Meetchiyai thedi
Ganapathi oru keezhmattathu oozhiyan
Nadhiyum Malayum
Penn, thozhi, thalaivi

Short story collections
Singa Rajakumari
Mudalil Iravu Varum
Kanavu kumizhigal
Kaal vali
Oru arayil irandu naarkaligal
Pudhumaipithanin dhrogam 
nilalgal

Plays
Puzhudhiyil veenai

References

External links
A critical commentary on Adhavan's writings in Thisaigal magazine - Part 1, Part 2 and Part 3

Tamil writers
Novelists from Tamil Nadu
Recipients of the Sahitya Akademi Award in Tamil
1942 births
1987 deaths
Indian Tamil people
People from Tirunelveli district
20th-century Indian dramatists and playwrights
20th-century Indian short story writers
20th-century Indian novelists
Dramatists and playwrights from Tamil Nadu